The discography of Eisley, an American rock band from Tyler, Texas. Eisley is composed of Sherri DuPree-Bemis (vocals, guitar), Stacy DuPree-King (vocals, keyboard), Chauntelle DuPree D'Agostino (guitar, vocals), Weston DuPree (drums) and Garron DuPree (bass guitar).  They have released three studio albums, ten EPs, and seven music videos. In addition, they have appeared on numerous compilation albums and have recorded many tracks that were never officially released.

Albums

Chart Positions

EPs

Music videos

Independent recordings
Eisley's early independent recordings have been confusing for new fans. The track listings are:
 EP1 – "Pretender", "Dream for Me", "Blackened Crown"
 EP2 version 1 – "Telescope Eyes", "Over the Mountains We Go", "Head Against the Sky"
 EP2 version 2 – Version 1 plus "Dream for Me" and "Blackened Crown"
 EP2 version 3 – Version 2 plus "Mister Pine" and "Laughing City"

Eisley simply added the best of each EP and carried them forward. None of these recordings was released officially but sold at hundreds of shows between 1999 and 2003. EP2 version 3 contains all of the songs from the previous versions, including EP1, except for "Pretender." All songs on the independent recordings are owned by Eisley and they have generously allowed their fans to offer them for download from various places on the web.

See also
 Eisley

References

External links
Official website
Official Eisley MySpace page
Brewtones website

Discographies of American artists